The Battle of Korakesion, also known as the Battle of Coracaesium, was a naval battle fought in 67 BC between the Cilician Pirates and the Roman Republic. It was the culmination of Pompey the Great's campaign against the pirates of the Mediterranean; Plutarch describes it as the key battle of Pompey's clearing of the Mediterranean of pirates after several smaller battles. According to Plutarch the pirates had about a thousand ships (almost certainly an exaggeration) against Pompey's two hundred, but were defeated in the initial naval engagement. Florus also states it was not a hard-fought affair as the pirates soon realised they were out-classed and most of them simply surrendered. After retreating to the shore, the remaining pirates were apparently besieged in the town of Coracaesium, modern day Alanya, before surrendering.

References

Korakesion
67 BC
History of Alanya
Korakesion
Korakesion
Piracy in the Mediterranean
Cilicia (Roman province)